Abdulaziz bin Saud Al Saud ( ʿAbd al ʿAzīz ibn Suʿūd Āl Suʿūd; born 4 November 1983) is a Saudi royal who has been the minister of interior of Saudi Arabia since 21 June 2017.

Early life and education
Abdulaziz bin Saud is the eldest son of Saud bin Nayef, who is the eldest son of the former Crown Prince Nayef bin Abdulaziz. His mother is Abeer bint Faisal bin Turki.

He is a graduate of the Dhahran Ahliyyah School and King Saud University.

Career
After King Salman came to power, Abdulaziz was appointed as an adviser to the Royal Court in various departments, and later served as an adviser at the defense ministry. On 21 June 2017 he was named the interior minister.

References

Arab News,"King Salman,Crown Prince thank interior minister for lowering crime", April 2018

External links

Abdulaziz
1983 births
Abdulaziz
Abdulaziz
Living people
Abdulaziz